Oboya is a surname. Notable people with the surname include:

Bendere Oboya (born 2000), Australian athlete
Patrick Oboya (born 1987), Kenyan footballer